This is a list of mayors of St. John's, Newfoundland and Labrador.

Between 1888-1898 council consisted of five councillors elected by wards and two members appointed by the Newfoundland government. Then from 1898-1902 government by commission. In 1902, legislation passed that dictated a municipal council would be formed by six councillors-at-large and one mayor, elected by those citizens of St. John's who pay property taxes. The city council currently comprises 11 members: the Mayor, the Deputy Mayor and nine councillors, five which represent wards throughout the city and four that are elected at large.

Notes
 On July 1, 1914, elected municipal government was suspended in favour of commission of government

See also
2021 Newfoundland and Labrador municipal elections

References

St. John's